Dyumina is a rural locality in Nikolsky Selsoviet Rural Settlement, Oktyabrsky District, Kursk Oblast, Russia. Population:

Geography 
The village is located on the Rogozna River (a right tributary of the Seym River), 77 km from the Russia–Ukraine border, 28 km north-west of Kursk, 20 km north-west of the district center – the urban-type settlement Pryamitsyno, 0.5 km from the selsoviet center – Stoyanova.

 Climate
Dyumina has a warm-summer humid continental climate (Dfb in the Köppen climate classification).

Transport 
Dyumina is located 22 km from the federal route  Crimea Highway (a part of the European route ), 15.5 km from the road of regional importance  (Kursk – Lgov – Rylsk – border with Ukraine), 4 km from the road of intermunicipal significance  (Dyakonovo – Starkovo – Sokolovka), on the road  (38N-073 – Stoyanova), 17 km from the nearest railway halt 433 km (railway line Lgov I — Kursk).

The rural locality is situated 38 km from Kursk Vostochny Airport, 140 km from Belgorod International Airport and 240 km from Voronezh Peter the Great Airport.

References

Notes

Sources

Rural localities in Oktyabrsky District, Kursk Oblast